First Message is the debut album from Japanese singer, Ayaka.

Background 
After a year of releasing singles and music videos, the album was originally for an early September release but was pushed back to allow Ayaka's single, Mikazuki, to correspond with the album release. It entered the Oricon charts at number one. The album has also been released on iTunes in Japan and other countries, including the United States.

Commercial performance
The album debuted at #1 on Oricon with sales of approximately 351,000 copies. This is also the highest debut sales for a female artist since Mika Nakashima's debut album, True, released nearly four years prior. By the end of 2006, the album had sold 711,299 copies and was the #13 highest selling album of the year. As of June 20, 2007, the album has sold another 337,883 units. Its total stands at 1,194,777 units sold since its release. It is expected for the album to rank in the top 30 yearly charts again in 2007, due to more than 300,000 copies in sales.

Her debut album re-entered the charts at #148 in 2009, and it peaked at #72 on April 15, 2009, Weekly Chart.

Track listing

Charts

Oricon Sales Chart (Japan)

References

2006 albums
Ayaka albums
Warner Music Japan albums